Gilahina River is a waterway in the U.S. state of Alaska in the Wrangell–St. Elias National Park and Preserve.

Three miles from the Chitina, it forks. There are no glaciers in the basin, and at normal stages, the water is clear and free from sediment. The valley floor is made up of gravel, boulders, sand, and clay, and at high stages, the stream transports considerable material, causing marked changes in the channel.

See also
List of rivers of Alaska

References

Rivers of Alaska
Rivers of Copper River Census Area, Alaska
Rivers of Unorganized Borough, Alaska